Paldemic is a 2020 television special created as a follow-up of the show Kenny vs. Spenny which ended in 2010. The special reunites Kenny Hotz and Spencer Rice during the COVID-19 pandemic in Canada.

Reception 
The special was met with positive reviews.

Awards

References

External links 
 

2020 in Canadian television
CBC Gem original programming
Canadian television specials
Cultural responses to the COVID-19 pandemic
2020 films